Domangart or Domangairt is a given name. Notable people with the name include:

Comgall mac Domangairt, king of Dál Riata in the early 6th century
Domangart mac Domnaill (died 673) king in Dál Riata (modern western Scotland) and the son of Domnall Brecc
Domangart Réti, king of Dál Riata in the early 6th century, following the death of his father, Fergus Mór
Eochaid mac Domangairt (died ca. 697), king of Dál Riata (modern western Scotland) in about 697
Gabrán mac Domangairt, king of Dál Riata in the middle of the 6th century